Padang Gajah is a small village in Perak, Malaysia. This small village is located at Terong near Taiping.

Notable birthplace
Yusof Ishak – Second Yang di-Pertuan Negara of Singapore (1959–1965) and the First President of the Republic of Singapore (1965–1970)

Villages in Perak